The China Support Network (CSN) is a U.S.-based organization promoting democracy for mainland China. CSN provides news, commentary, information and analysis on events, issues, demonstrations and government policy related to their cause. According to the organization, it supports democratic reform, human rights, and freedom in China.

The China Support Network was founded in 1989 by John Patrick Kusumi, who serves as its president. The organization opposes China's current Communist Party-led government, and has worked with Chinese student leaders who left China following the 1989 Tiananmen Square protests and massacre and continues to have a working relationship with Chinese dissidents  and the Chinese democracy movement in the United States.

The China Support Network has described the People's Republic of China as "a dysfunctional country" and the Chinese Communist Party as "the world's most murderous system",  and alleges that the Chinese government supports terrorist organisations, including al-Qaeda. 

CSN criticized the plan of Pope Benedict XVI and the Catholic Church to remove its embassy from Taiwan in an effort to improve ties with the government of the People's Republic of China and its Chinese Patriotic Catholic Association. 

CSN launched the "Freedom First, Olympics Second Coalition" (FFOSC) in support of a boycott of the 2008 Summer Olympics in China. Members of the FFOSC include the Montagnard Foundation, Free China Movement and Dictator Watch. 

Political organizations based in the United States